Turanovia incompleta is an extinct species of archidermapteran earwig. It is the only species in the genus Turanovia and family Turanoviidae. It is found in the Middle-Late Jurassic (Callovian-Oxfordian) Karabastau Formation of Kazakhstan.

References

External links
 The Tree of Life's article on Archidermaptera

Archidermaptera